BFX may refer to:

 Bafoussam Airport, Cameroon (IATA airport code)
 Buffalo–Exchange Street station, United States (Amtrak station code BFX)